Yaroslav Vladimirovich Askarov (born 16 June 2002) is a Russian professional ice hockey goaltender currently playing for the Milwaukee Admirals in the American Hockey League (AHL) as a prospect to the Nashville Predators of the National Hockey League (NHL). He was selected eleventh overall by the Nashville Predators in the 2020 NHL Entry Draft, where he was considered as the top ranked goaltender.

Playing career
Askarov played as a youth with Buldogi St. Petersburg at the under-16 level in 2017 before joining powerhouse club, SKA Saint Petersburg, to continue his development.

During the 2019–20 season, on 27 November 2019, Askarov made his KHL debut at the age of 17. He collected his first win in that game, allowing two goals in a victory over HC Sochi.

Following completion of the 2021–22 season with SKA, Askarov continued his season in North America by agreeing to a try-out contract for the playoffs with the Predators AHL affiliate, the Milwaukee Admirals, on 3 May 2022. While with the Admirals, Askarov was signed by the Predators to a three-year, entry-level contract on 17 May 2022.

During the  season, on 11 January 2023, Askarov was recalled by the Predators and made his NHL debut on 12 January 2023 in a 4-3 loss to the Montreal Canadiens.

Career statistics

Regular season and playoffs

International

Awards and honors

References

External links
 

2002 births
Living people
Milwaukee Admirals players
Nashville Predators draft picks
Nashville Predators players
National Hockey League first-round draft picks
Russian ice hockey goaltenders
SKA-1946 players
SKA-Neva players
SKA Saint Petersburg players
Sportspeople from Omsk